Krappe is a surname. Notable people with the surname include:

 Alexander Haggerty Krappe (1894–1947), American folklorist and author
 Günther Krappe (1893–1981), German army officer